Ronald Hikspoors (born 27 April 1988 in Geldrop) is a Dutch footballer who last plays as a striker also centre-back.

Career

Sarawak
A trialist for Malaysian club Sarawak in late 2013, Hikspoors failed to earn a contract with the team but in 2014 the media spread rumors that he was the best choice to replace Muamer Salibašić as forward and the forward finally signed a one-year contract by the end of the year. Usually playing as an attacker, Hikspoors put in a solid display in the back line for his team, forcing opponents JDT to just long shots.

PSM Makassar

A mid-season foreign import to PSM Makassar in 2016, the Dutchman notched his first goal for the Indonesian outfit in a round 10 clash against Persib Bandung in the 65th minute. In response, the Persib Bandung staff and players lacerated the referee for his decision to let the goal count but the game resumed play shortly after. One game later, however, Hikspoors' time in Indonesia was cut short by colliding with two opposing players and getting pulled out 15 minutes into a match versus Persiba Balikpapan. The injury he suffered forced him to miss the rest of the season and undergo recovery in his native Netherlands.

Throughout his stay in Indonesia, the footballer was suspended once for getting two straight yellow cards.

References

Expatriate footballers in the Czech Republic
Expatriate footballers in Indonesia
Dutch expatriate footballers
Association football forwards
Expatriate footballers in Malaysia
Malaysia Super League players
1988 births
Living people
People from Geldrop
Sarawak FA players
PSM Makassar players
FK Varnsdorf players
Dutch footballers
Footballers from North Brabant